Kimber Rickabaugh of RickMill Productions (founded 1991), along with her partner Paul Miller, is a veteran producer responsible for numerous  television shows for Comedy Central, HBO and other networks. After starting at NBC in New York, she next was under contract with Dick Clark Productions until she went freelance as a producer in 1986, where she produced HBO's first LIVE Comedy Special. In 1986 she married Gene Crowe, a technical director and design engineer and co owner of Greene Crowe & Co. inc. Rickabaugh and Crowe have worked together a few times on shows such as George Lopez, The Whoopi Goldberg Show, and The Earth Day Special.  Rickabaugh formed RickMill Productions in 1991 with Paul Miller, who also directs, and the team continues to be active producers of comedy and variety series and specials. She  produced, to name a few, all of the George Carlin HBO specials, for Dave Chappelle, Whoopi Goldberg, Howie Mandel, Lewis Black, MTV and  multiple specials and series yearly. RickMill Productions produced 15  seasons of "Comedy Central Presents" series. RickMill also has an ongoing relationship  with Kathy Griffin. The relationship with  Kathy Griffin  started in 2010, producing all her stand-up specials for BRAVO. Kathy Griffin set an unprecedented feat of 4 one-hour specials in 2011. RickMill  produced all Kathy's specials in 2012 and 2013 where Kathy set a new record for the most  televised comedy specials surpassing George Carlin's record.

External links 
RickMill Productions website
Comedy Central press article

SwanShadow Thinks Out Loud

Living people
Year of birth missing (living people)
American television producers
American women television producers
21st-century American women